Nashik Central Assembly constituency is one of the 288 Vidhan Sabha (Assembly) constituencies of Maharashtra state in Western India. It is one of the six assembly segments under Nashik (Lok Sabha constituency).

Members of Legislative Assembly

Election results

General elections 2009

General elections 2014

References

Assembly constituencies of Nashik district
Nashik
Assembly constituencies of Maharashtra